"Getaway Car" is a song written by songwriters Gary Haase and Billy Mann. The song was first recorded in 1999 by Susan Ashton, an American country and Christian singer, on her album Closer, although it was not released as a single.

Since then, the song has been recorded by the country groups 4 Runner and The Jenkins, R&B group Dakota Moon, as well as the rock duo Hall & Oates. 4 Runner, The Jenkins and Hall & Oates all released their renditions as singles. 4 Runner's version, however, did not chart. Hall & Oates's version was released in late 2003 as the fifth and final single from their 2002 album Do It for Love, reaching number 21 on the Billboard Hot Adult Contemporary Tracks charts with it.

In 2004, The Jenkins released their version as the second and final single from their unreleased, self-titled debut album. This rendition reached a peak of number 38 on the Billboard Hot Country Singles & Tracks (now Hot Country Songs) charts in August 2004, becoming the Jenkins' final chart single.

Chart performance

Hall & Oates

The Jenkins

References

1999 songs
2003 singles
2004 singles
4 Runner songs
Hall & Oates songs
The Jenkins songs
Music videos directed by Trey Fanjoy
Songs written by Billy Mann
Song recordings produced by Brian Rawling
Capitol Records Nashville singles
Song recordings produced by Mark Taylor (record producer)
Song recordings produced by Rodney Crowell
Susan Ashton songs